The total boron (BT) is the sum of boron species in a solution. In the environment these species usually include boric acid and borate, for example:

BT = [] + []

where

BT is the total boron concentration
[] is the dihydrogen borate concentration
[] is the boric acid concentration

Total boron is an important quantity when determining alkalinity due to borate's contribution to a solution's acid neutraling capacity. Total boron is a conservative element in seawater, and can thus be calculated by simply knowing the salinity.

See also
 Total organic carbon
 Total Alkalinity(AT) 
 pH

Chemical oceanography
Analytical chemistry
Boron